Psychotrieae is a tribe of flowering plants in the family Rubiaceae and contains about 2114 species in 17 genera. Its representatives are found in the tropics and subtropics. Several genera are Myrmecophytes (ant plants)

Genera
Currently accepted names

 Amaracarpus  (30 sp.) - Seychelles, from Andaman Islands to northern Vanuatu
 Anthorrhiza  (9 sp.) - Papua New Guinea
 Apomuria  (12 sp.) - Madagascar
 Calycosia  (8 sp.) - New Guinea, Solomon Islands, Fiji, Samoa, Society Islands
 Cremocarpon  (9 sp.) - Comoros, Madagascar
 Dolianthus  (13 sp.) - New Guinea
 Gillespiea  (1 sp.) - Fiji
 Hydnophytum  (94 sp.) - Indo-China to southwestern Pacific region
 Myrmecodia  (27 sp.) - from Vietnam to northern Australia
 Myrmephytum  (5 sp.) - Philippines, Sulawesi, New Guinea
 Psychotria  (1874 sp.) - tropics and subtropics
 Ronabea  (3 sp.) - Tropical America
 Squamellaria  (4 sp.) - Fiji
 Streblosa  (25 sp.) - from Thailand to Malesia

Synonyms

Antherura  = Psychotria
Aucubiphyllum  = Psychotria
Baldingera  = Psychotria
Callicocca  = Psychotria
Calycodendron  = Psychotria
Camptopus  = Psychotria
Cephaelis  = Psychotria
Chesnea  = Psychotria
Chicoinaea  = Psathura
Coddingtonia  = Psychotria
Codonocalyx  = Psychotria
Delpechia  = Psychotria
Douarrea  = Psychotria
Dychotria  = Psychotria
Epidendroides  = Myrmecodia
Eumorphanthus  = Psychotria
Eurhotia  = Psychotria
Furcatella  = Psychotria
Galvania  = Psychotria
Gamotopea  = Psychotria
Grumilea  = Psychotria
Hylacium  = Psychotria
Lasiostoma  = Hydnophytum
Macrocalyx  = Psychotria
Mapouria  = Psychotria
Megalopus  = Psychotria
Melachone  = Amaracarpus
Myrmedoma  = Myrmephytum
Myrstiphylla  = Psychotria
Myrstiphyllum  = Psychotria
Naletonia  = Psychotria
Neoschimpera  = Amaracarpus
Petagomoa  = Psychotria
Pleureia  = Psychotria
Polyozus  = Psychotria
Psathura  = Pyschotria
Psychotrion  = Psychotria
Psychotrophum  = Psychotria
Pyragra  = Psychotria
Ronabia  = Psychotria
Stellix  = Psychotria
Straussia  = Psychotria
Sulcanux  = Psychotria
Suteria  = Psychotria
Tapogomea  = Psychotria
Trevirania  = Psychotria
Trigonopyren  = Pyschotria
Uragoga  = Psychotria

References

 
Rubioideae tribes